John Dubois served as the third bishop of the Roman Catholic Diocese of New York from 1826 until his death in 1842. He was the first Bishop of New York who was not Irish-born and, as of 2021, remains the only Bishop or Archbishop of New York who was not either of Irish birth or of Irish ancestry.

Life

Early life
Dubois was born in Paris, France, on August 24, 1764. After theological studies at the Oratorian Seminary of Saint-Magloire in Paris, Dubois was ordained a priest on September 22, 1787, by Antoine-Eléonore-Léon Le Clerc de Juigné, the Archbishop of Paris. In Paris, Father Dubois served as an assistant to the curé of St. Sulpice as well as chaplain to the Hospice des Petite Maisons, which was under the direction of the Daughters of Charity of Saint Vincent de Paul.

The French Revolution placed many clergy in a dilemma, for the new regime required an oath renouncing loyalty to Rome and accepting the French government's authority over the church. Many Sulpicians fled to England, and in early 1791 Charles Nagot led a group which sailed to Baltimore, Maryland, where they opened a seminary, Saint Mary's, which is still in operation today.  Dubois had attended the Collège Louis LeGrand with Maximilien Robespierre, who helped the disguised 27-year-old priest escape in June 1791 from what became the massacre of the non-oathtaking clergy, before his own fall from power and execution.

Emigration to America
Father Dubois landed at Norfolk, Virginia in August, 1791, bearing commendatory letters from the Marquis de Lafayette (whose wife was devout) to James Monroe, Patrick Henry, and members of other distinguished families including the Lees, Randolphs and Beverleys. All received him cordially, even ardent supporters of revolutionary principles like Mr. Monroe, who served as his host until Father Dubois rented a house in Richmond near a major bridge and opened a school to teach French, classics and arithmetic. Virginia had disestablished the Episcopal Church by statute in 1786, and that law also guaranteed freedom of religion, releasing the Commonwealth's small Catholic population from civil restrictions. Patrick Henry helped the priest learn English, and the two priests who alternated holding religious services in the capitol, the Episcopalian John Buchanan and the Presbyterian John Blair, became his friends. At the General Assembly's invitation, Rev. Dubois even once celebrated Mass in the courtroom of the new State House, but for two years mostly celebrated mass in rented rooms or at the homes of the town's few Catholic families.

In 1788, John Carroll, whom the Holy See had appointed superior of the American mission, was elected Bishop of Baltimore, with the permission of Pope Pius VI. In 1794, Bishop Carroll assigned Father Dubois to help in the pastoral care of the new nation's growing Catholic population nearer the Appalachian Mountains, with a base in Frederick, Maryland, which had become Maryland's second largest city as well as gateway to both Virginia's Shenandoah Valley and the trans-Appalachian Ohio Valley. After a farewell party in Richmond, the new missionary moved to Frederick, where he would serve a region stretching as far as the Mississippi River. The Jesuits, temporarily disestablished by the Holy See (only being restored as a religious order in the United States in 1805), had been serving this region's growing population for over a century. Their former residence in Frederick contained a chapel dedicated to St. Stanislaus Kostka. Meanwhile, the town was booming. On May 15, 1800, Father Dubois consecrated the cornerstone of a new brick church on the North side of Second Street, naming the parish after St. John the Evangelist. For the next eleven years, Father Dubois served as pastor of St. John's Church, as well he traveled out  into the frontier.

In 1808, DuBois founded Mount St. Mary's College in Emmitsburg, Maryland and became its first president. Later that same year, in November 1808, he joined the Sulpician Order. The seminary trained missionaries, and was located on one of the major trans-Appalachian routes. During his presidency and with his support, a young New York widow, Elizabeth Bayley Seton, moved to Emmitsburg and founded the country's first Catholic girls' school as well as the first religious institute of teaching Sisters in the nation. Seton was canonized a saint in 1975.

In 1824, DuBois formally left the Sulpician Order, and carried on operating Mount St. Mary's and supporting Mother Seton's fledgling order until he was appointed Bishop of New York.

Episcopate

On May 23, 1826, the Vatican appointed Dubois bishop of the Catholic Diocese of New York at the recommendation of Anthony Kohlmann, former pastor of St. Peter's Church in Manhattan, who was then teaching at the Gregorian University in Rome. DuBois was consecrated at the Baltimore Cathedral by the Archbishop of Baltimore, Ambrose Maréchal S.S., on October 29, 1826. His appointment was not well received in some quarters. Although DuBois had acquired an adequate command of English, he spoke with an accent and was therefore viewed as a "foreigner". There was also some partisan support for the appointment of John Power, who had been serving as the Vicar-General of the diocese. It was supposed that Archbishop Maréchal, also a French-born Sulpician, had arranged for DuBois to be appointed. At one point the trustees of St. Patrick's Old Cathedral withheld contributions for food and shelter.

In 1837 Dubois traveled to Salina near Syracuse, to perform the marriage of Silas Titus and Eliza McCarthy, daughter of Thomas McCarthy (nominated first Mayor of Syracuse, New York) and sister of Dennis McCarthy. The marriage certificate became the first record of a Catholic service in Onondaga County. John McCloskey, later to become the first Archbishop of New York to be created cardinal, accompanied Dubois to Salina as a guide. Feeling the weight of age and care, in 1837 Dubois, asked for a coadjutor.

During his tenure, six new parishes were established in the city. He also commissioned Phillip O’Reilly O.P. to serve the "Congregation of the Hudson" north of Manhattan. The DuBois ordered that all church collections on Christmas Day be directed to the care of orphans. In 1838, he extended this to include the collection at Easter.

Dubois is buried under the sidewalk at the entrance to the Old St Patrick's Cathedral on Mott Street, which he requested, so that people could "walk on me in death, as they wished to in life". A plaque at the church's entrance memorializes the early bishop.

References

External links

St. John the Evangelist Roman Catholic Church of Frederick, Maryland

1764 births
1842 deaths
Sulpicians
Clergy from Paris
18th-century French Roman Catholic priests
French emigrants to the United States
Presidents of Mount St. Mary's University
19th-century Roman Catholic bishops in the United States
Roman Catholic bishops of New York
Sulpician bishops
Burials at St. Patrick's Old Cathedral
18th-century American clergy